Harvey L. Nitrauer (March 6, 1906 – June 24, 1988) was a Republican member of the Pennsylvania House of Representatives.

References

Republican Party members of the Pennsylvania House of Representatives
1906 births
1988 deaths
20th-century American politicians